The National Aboriginal & Torres Strait Islander Art Award (NATSIAA) is Australia's longest running Indigenous art award. Established in 1984 as the National Aboriginal Art Award by the Museum and Art Gallery of the Northern Territory in Darwin, the annual award is commonly referred to as the Telstra National Aboriginal & Torres Strait Islander Art Award, the Telstra Award or Telstra Prize. It is open to all Aboriginal and Torres Strait Islander artists working in all media.

 the top prize is worth , and the total prize pool , making it as of August 2022 the richest art prize in the country.

History
The NATSIAA was established in 1984 as the National Aboriginal Art Award. Telstra has sponsored the awards since 1992. 

The Darwin Aboriginal Art Fair began as a complement to NATSIAA, but is now a separate event under the umbrella of the Darwin Festival.

There have also been two travelling exhibitions, in 2000 and 2003, enabling up to 50 selected works to be shown in regional galleries around Australia.

Categories

 there are six categories of awards as well as the main prize:
 Telstra Art Award ("The Big One") – 
 Telstra General Painting Award 
 Telstra Bark Painting Award
 Telstra Works on Paper Award
 Wandjuk Marika 3D Memorial Award
 Telstra Multimedia Award
 Telstra Emerging Artist Award

List of winners 
List of NATSIAA award winners

References

External links

Australian Aboriginal art
Australian art awards
Organisations serving Indigenous Australians
Awards honoring indigenous people
Awards established in 1984
1984 establishments in Australia